Richard Stein may refer to:

Richard S. Stein, American scientist
Richard Frey, born Richard Stein, Austrian-born Chinese doctor and politician